Puente de la Unidad or Viaducto de la Unidad is a cantilever spar cable-stayed bridge designed by Óscar Bulnes that crosses the Santa Catarina River and connects the cities of Monterrey and San Pedro Garza García in the Mexican state of Nuevo León. It is part of a circuit called "Circuito La Unidad", which would consist of the interconnection of a series of avenues.

History 
The bridge was finished in 2003 and has been controversial even before its completion because the river it crosses is dry almost all year long.

Although a huge part of the cost of this bridge was done by the business class of Monterrey, they were aware that the Santa Catarina River is affected by overflowing water from saturated rain caused by hurricanes. The San Pedro neighborhood is very well connected to the Colinas San Jerónimo and Cumbres vicinity using this bridge.

Last 2010, Hurricane Alex burst millions of metric tons of water. The water carried garbage on its path, damaging almost every structure of the previously dry river.

This method of construction respects the natural pathway of the dry river at demanding intervals.

See also 
Puente de la Mujer, Buenos Aires, Argentina
Samuel Beckett Bridge, Dublin, Ireland
Sundial Bridge at Turtle Bay, California, United States
Puente del Alamillo, Seville, Spain
Assut de l'Or Bridge, Valencia, Spain
Margaret Hunt Hill Bridge, Dallas, Texas, United States

References 

Buildings and structures in Monterrey
Unidad
Unidad
Inclined towers